The first British Fell Running Championships, then known as Fell Runner of the Year, were held in 1972 and the scoring was based on results in all fell races.  In 1976 this was changed to the runner's best ten category A races and further changes took place to the format in later years. Starting with the 1986 season, an English Fell Running Championships series has also taken place, based on results in various races of different lengths over the year.

Winners of British championships
The winners of the British Championships have been as follows.

All Jeska's athletics results were declared null and void when she failed to produce samples of her testosterone levels.

References

External links
 Fellrunner.org.uk

Fell running competitions